The Roman Catholic Diocese of Itapipoca is a diocese located in the city of Itapipoca in the Ecclesiastical province of Fortaleza in Brazil.

History
 March 13, 1971: Established as Diocese of Itapipoca from the Metropolitan Archdiocese of Fortaleza

Leadership
 Bishops of Itapipoca (Roman rite), in reverse chronological order
 Bishop Antônio Roberto Cavuto, O.F.M. Cap. (2005.05.25 – present)
 Bishop Benedito Francisco de Albuquerque (1985.01.04 – 2005.05.25)
 Bishop Paulo Eduardo Andrade Ponte (1971.06.25 – 1984.03.20), appointed Archbishop of São Luís do Maranhão

References
 GCatholic.org
 Catholic Hierarchy
 Diocese website (Portuguese) 

Roman Catholic dioceses in Brazil
Christian organizations established in 1971
Itapipoca, Roman Catholic Diocese of
Roman Catholic dioceses and prelatures established in the 20th century